Mount Lama is a bare rock peak over  high, culminating the ridge north of Miers Glacier and forming the south rampart of the valley named Shangri-la in Victoria Land, Antarctica. It was named in association with Shangri-la by the New Zealand Victoria University of Wellington Antarctic Expedition, 1960–61.

References

Mountains of Victoria Land
Scott Coast